A caryatid ( or   or ; , pl. ) is a sculpted female figure serving as an architectural support taking the place of a column or a pillar supporting an entablature on her head. The Greek term karyatides literally means "maidens of Karyai", an ancient town on the Peloponnese. Karyai had a temple dedicated to the goddess Artemis in her aspect of Artemis Karyatis: "As Karyatis she rejoiced in the dances of the nut-tree village of Karyai, those Karyatides, who in their ecstatic round-dance carried on their heads baskets of live reeds, as if they were dancing plants".

An atlas or telamon is a male version of a caryatid, i.e. a sculpted male statue serving as an architectural support.

Etymology
The term is first recorded in the Latin form caryatides by the Roman architect Vitruvius. He stated in his 1st century BC work De architectura (I.1.5) that the female figures of the Erechtheion represented the punishment of the women of Caryae, a town near Sparta in Laconia, who were condemned to slavery after betraying Athens by siding with Persia in the Greco-Persian Wars. However, Vitruvius's explanation is doubtful; well before the Persian Wars, female figures were used as decorative supports in Greece and the ancient Near East. Vitruvius's explanation is dismissed as an error by Camille Paglia in Glittering Images and not even mentioned by Mary Lefkowitz in Black Athena Revisited. They both say the term refers to young women worshipping Artemis in Caryae through dance. Lefkowitz says that the term comes from the Spartan city of Caryae, where young women did a ring dance around an open-air statue of the goddess Artemis, locally identified with a walnut tree. Bernard Sergent specifies that the dancers came to the small town of Caryae from nearby Sparta. Nevertheless, the association of caryatids with slavery persists and is prevalent in Renaissance art.

The ancient Caryae supposedly was one of the six adjacent villages that united to form the original township of Sparta, and the hometown of Menelaos' queen, Helen of Troy. Girls from Caryae were considered especially beautiful, strong, and capable of giving birth to strong children.

A caryatid supporting a basket on her head is called a canephora ("basket-bearer"), representing one of the maidens who carried sacred objects used at feasts of the goddesses Athena and Artemis. The Erectheion caryatids, in a shrine dedicated to an archaic king of Athens, may therefore represent priestesses of Artemis in Caryae, a place named for the "nut-tree sisterhood" – apparently in Mycenaean times, like other plural feminine toponyms, such as Hyrai or Athens itself.

The later male counterpart of the caryatid is referred to as a telamon (plural telamones) or atlas (plural atlantes) – the name refers to the legend of Atlas, who bore the sphere of the heavens on his shoulders. Such figures were used on a monumental scale, notably in the Temple of Olympian Zeus in Agrigento, Sicily.

Ancient usage

Some of the earliest known examples were found in the treasuries of Delphi, including that of Siphnos, dating to the 6th century BC. However, their use as supports in the form of women can be traced back even earlier, to ritual basins, ivory mirror handles from Phoenicia, and draped figures from archaic Greece.

The best-known and most-copied examples are those of the six figures of the Caryatid porch of the Erechtheion on the Acropolis at Athens.  One of those original six figures, removed by Lord Elgin in the early 19th century in an act which severely damaged the temple and is widely considered to be vandalism and looting, is currently in the British Museum in London. The Greek government does not recognise the British Museum's claims to own any part of the Acropolis temples and the return of the stolen Caryatid to Athens along with the rest of the so-called Elgin Marbles is the subject of a major international campaign. The Acropolis Museum holds the other five figures, which are replaced onsite by replicas. The five originals that are in Athens are now being exhibited in the new Acropolis Museum, on a special balcony that allows visitors to view them from all sides. The pedestal for the caryatid removed to London remains empty, awaiting for its return. From 2011 to 2015, they were cleaned by a specially constructed laser beam, which removed accumulated soot and grime without harming the marble's patina. Each caryatid was cleaned in place, with a television circuit relaying the spectacle live to museum visitors.

Although of the same height and build, and similarly attired and coiffed, the six Caryatids are not the same: their faces, stance, draping, and hair are carved separately; the three on the left stand on their right foot, while the three on the right stand on their left foot.  Their bulky, intricately arranged hairstyles serve the crucial purpose of providing static support to their necks, which would otherwise be the thinnest and structurally weakest part.

The Romans also copied the Erechtheion caryatids, installing copies in the Forum of Augustus and the Pantheon in Rome, and at Hadrian's Villa at Tivoli.  Another Roman example, found on the Via Appia, is the Townley Caryatid.

Renaissance and after

In Early Modern times, the practice of integrating caryatids into building facades was revived, and in interiors they began to be employed in fireplaces, which had not been a feature of buildings in Antiquity and offered no precedents. Early interior examples are the figures of Heracles and Iole carved on the jambs of a monumental fireplace in the Sala della Jole of the Doge's Palace, Venice, about 1450. In the following century Jacopo Sansovino, both sculptor and architect, carved a pair of female figures supporting the shelf of a marble chimneypiece at Villa Garzoni, near Padua. No architect mentioned the device until 1615, when Palladio's pupil Vincenzo Scamozzi included a chapter devoted to chimneypieces in his Idea della archittura universale. Those in the apartments of princes and important personages, he considered, might be grand enough for chimneypieces with caryatid supporters, such as one he illustrated and a similar one he installed in the Sala dell'Anticollegio, also in the Doge's Palace.

In the 16th century, from the examples engraved for Sebastiano Serlio's treatise on architecture, caryatids became a fixture in the decorative vocabulary of Northern Mannerism expressed by the Fontainebleau School and the engravers of designs in Antwerp. In the early 17th century, interior examples appear in Jacobean interiors in England; in Scotland the overmantel in the great hall of Muchalls Castle remains an early example. Caryatids remained part of the German Baroque vocabulary and were refashioned in more restrained and "Grecian" forms by neoclassical architects and designers, such as the four terracotta caryatids on the porch of St Pancras New Church, London (1822). 

Many caryatids lined up on the facade of the 1893 Palace of the Arts housing the Museum of Science and Industry in Chicago. In the arts of design, the draped figure supporting an acanthus-grown basket capital taking the form of a candlestick or a table-support is a familiar cliché of neoclassical decorative arts. The John and Mable Ringling Museum of Art in Sarasota has caryatids as a motif on its eastern facade.

In 1905 American sculptor Augustus Saint Gaudens created a caryatid porch for the Albright–Knox Art Gallery in Buffalo, New York in which four of the eight figures (the other four figures holding only wreaths) represented a different art form, Architecture, Painting, Sculpture, and Music.

Auguste Rodin's 1881 sculpture Fallen Caryatid Carrying her Stone (part of his monumental The Gates of Hell work) shows a fallen caryatid. Robert Heinlein described this piece in Stranger in a Strange Land: "Now here we have another emotional symbol... for almost three thousand years or longer, architects have designed buildings with columns shaped as female figures... After all those centuries it took Rodin to see that this was work too heavy for a girl... Here is this poor little caryatid who has tried—and failed, fallen under the load.... She didn't give up, Ben; she's still trying to lift that stone after it has crushed her..."

In Act 2 of his 1953 play 'Waiting for Godot', author Samuel Beckett has Estragon say "We are not caryatids!" when he and Vladimir tire of "cart(ing) around" the recently blinded Pozzo. 

Agnes Varda made two short films documenting Caryatid columns around Paris.
1984 Les Dites Cariatides
2005 Les Dites Cariatides Bis.

The musical group Son Volt evoke the caryatides and their burden borne in poetic metaphor on the song "Caryatid Easy" from their 1997 album Straightaways, with singer Jay Farrar reproving an unidentified lover with the line "you play the caryatid easy."

Gallery

See also
Caryatid stools in African art
Term (architecture)
The Sphere: Große Kugelkaryatide (Great Spherical Caryatid) – WTC sculpture by Fritz Koenig

References

External links

Kerényi, Karl (1951) 1980. The Gods of the Greeks (Thames & Hudson)
Conserving the Caryatids in the Acropolis Museum
 Images of Caryatids of Athens (Spanish)

Acropolis of Athens
Ancient Greek architecture
Ancient Greek culture
Columns and entablature
Architectural sculpture
Sculptures of women